Yoshimoto Ishin (吉本伊信, May 25, 1916 - August 1, 1988) was a Japanese businessman and Jodo Shinshu Buddhist priest who was the founder of the Naikan (内観 looking inside) meditation method, which later was utilised as a psychotherapy treatment. He later acted as prison chaplain to spread Naikan to prisoners.

Life
1916 May 25 Born as 3rd son of Ihachi and Yukie Yoshimoto in Yamatokōriyama, Nara Prefecture.  Ihachi was a rich farmer. His father was strict and smart, and his mother was gentle.
1923 May 12. Younger sister Chieko happened to die of measles and Yukie got upset, and sought revelation  from Buddhism. Ishin visited temples accompanied with his mother, and since then he got interested in Buddhism.
1929 April. Graduated Katagiri Primary School and entered to Kōriyama Secondary School.
1930 September. Changed to Kōriyama Agricultural School according to father's advice.
1932 March. Graduated school and started to learn Jōdo Shinshū teachings at temple. Jōdo Shinshū is a sect of Buddhism founded by Shinran, and it requires strong faith to Amida Budda solely, praying mantra "Namu-Amidabustu".
1934 Ihachi opened a fertiliser shop in central Yamatokōriyama.

References

Psychotherapists
1916 births
1988 deaths
Jōdo Shinshū Buddhist priests
20th-century Buddhist monks